Interflug GmbH was the national airline of the German Democratic Republic from 1963 to 1990. Based in East Berlin, it operated scheduled and chartered flights to European and intercontinental destinations out of its hub at Berlin Schönefeld Airport, focusing on Comecon countries. Following German reunification, the company was liquidated.

History

Founding years

Until 1945, Deutsche Luft Hansa had served as German flag carrier. Following the end of World War II and the subsequent allied occupation of Germany, all aircraft in the country were seized and the airline was liquidated. In 1954, a West German company acquired the Lufthansa trademark. In 1955, Deutsche Lufthansa was founded as rival East German flag carrier. It soon became obvious that the East German airline would likely lose a lawsuit over the use of the Lufthansa branding. As a result, Interflug was set up on 18 September 1958 as a "back-up" company, initially intended to complement the East German aviation industry by operating chartered flights. In 1963, the East German Lufthansa was liquidated, officially due to poor profitability (though this step foreclosed the imminent stripping of the Lufthansa name). Its staff, aircraft fleet, and route network were transferred to Interflug, which henceforth served as the East German flag carrier.

East German national airline
As a state-owned airline, Interflug with its approximately 8,000 employees was under control of the National Defense Council, which held the supreme command of the East German armed forces. The majority of the pilots of Interflug were reserve officers of the National People's Army (and as such were required to be members of the Socialist Unity Party of Germany), and all its aircraft could be requisitioned for military purposes at any time. Klaus Henkes, who became General Director of the airline in 1978, had previously served as General of the East German Air Force. Applicants for the job of flight attendant needed to be approved of by the Stasi, in order to assess their so-called political reliability, minimizing espionage and defection attempts in Western countries. On pain of suspension, Interflug crews were not allowed to associate with employees of airlines from non-socialist countries.

Over the 1960s, the airline saw significant growth, both in its route network and its fleet of Soviet-built aircraft. The Ilyushin Il-18 turboprop airliner became the backbone of Interflug's short-haul flights during that period. The company had been the intended primary operator of the Baade 152, an early jet airliner constructed in East Germany. Its development never went beyond the prototype phase, though, and was abandoned in 1961. In 1969, the Tupolev Tu-134 was introduced, the first jet airliner operated by Interflug. It was operated on the airline's European routes. The long range Il-62 became part of the fleet in 1971. That same year, the number of annual Interflug passengers reached 1 million.

Following the 1970s energy crisis and growing fuel prices, Interflug gradually dismantled its domestic route network. The last scheduled domestic flight, from East Berlin to Erfurt, took place in April 1980.

Late 1980s and German reunification
During the 1980s, Interflug had to cope with increasing problems due to its ageing fleet: fuel efficiency was inferior to that of contemporary Western airliners, and noise protection regulations meant the airline had to pay increased landing fees and was even banned from operating at certain airports. With some exceptions, Western-built airliners (most notably those produced by Boeing, McDonnell Douglas and Airbus) could not be delivered to Soviet bloc countries because of the CoCom embargo. Following a deal between Boeing and LOT Polish Airlines for the purchase of six Boeing 767 aircraft, and in order to acknowledge the Perestroika movement, commercial airliners were exempted from the trade embargo in 1988. Malév Hungarian Airlines also bought Boeing aircraft in 1988, and later that year, Interflug placed an order for three Airbus A310 long-haul aircraft, worth DM 420 million. The deal was secured with the sponsorship of Franz Josef Strauss, then Minister-President of Bavaria, chairman of the Airbus supervisory board and responsible for West German loans to East Germany.

The first Airbus A310 was delivered to Interflug on 26 June 1989. The East German crews for the new aircraft type were trained in West Germany; aircraft maintenance was also performed there. The A310 allowed for non-stop flights to Cuba (flights had previously required a fuel stop at Gander International Airport in Canada).

Following the fall of the Berlin Wall on 9 November 1989 and the subsequent political upheaval in East Germany, several foreign airlines expressed interest in taking over parts of the highly unprofitable company to secure a share of the German air traffic market, especially out of Berlin. In early March 1990, Lufthansa signed a letter of intent to acquire 26 percent of Interflug, but the offer was blocked by Germany's Federal Cartel Office. Plans for a takeover by British Airways did not materialize either (the UK airline instead founded Deutsche BA in 1992). On 1 July 1990, Interflug became a member of the International Air Transport Association (IATA).

As a consequence of the German reunification on 3 October 1990, Interflug came under the administration of the Treuhandanstalt, along with all other state-owned property of East Germany. As no investors could be found, the liquidation of Interflug, then with 2,900 employees and 20 aircraft, was announced on 7 February 1991. Subsequently, the airline was dismantled. The last commercial flight (on the Berlin-Vienna-Berlin route, using a Tu-134) took place on 30 April 1991.

Legacy
Following the liquidation, a group of former Interflug employees acquired five of the company's Ilyushin Il-18 airliners and set up Il-18 Air Cargo, which soon became known as Berline, operating chartered cargo and leisure flights out of Schönefeld Airport.

The three Airbus A310 purchased by Interflug in 1988 were handed over by Treuhandanstalt to the Federal Republic of Germany and became part of the German Air Force, used for VIP transport of high-ranking politicians like the German president or chancellor.

Several former Interflug aircraft have been preserved in different places in Germany.

Route network

As the national airline of East Germany from 1963 to 1991, Interflug operated scheduled passenger flights to the following destinations.

Flights to Western countries

As a state-owned company of East Germany, Interflug had the important role of securing foreign currency exchange, as the national East German mark was considered a weak currency. For most of its existence, Interflug was not a member of the International Air Transport Association (IATA), and could therefore significantly undercut the ticket prices of other European carriers. From the 1970s, increased effort was put into operating chartered flights to Mediterranean and Black Sea holiday resorts, many of which specifically catered to West Germans (as travel restrictions applied for East Germans). Starting in that period, Interflug gained traffic rights to several destinations in Western Europe. All these flights could be booked at travel agencies in West Berlin and West Germany, which had signed sale contracts with Interflug. To simplify the transfer of passengers from West Berlin to and from Schönefeld Airport, a dedicated border crossing checkpoint was inaugurated at Waltersdorfer Chaussee, and scheduled shuttle buses were operated from the Central Bus Terminal in the Westend locality.

By the early 1980s, low Interflug ticket prices had considerablly impacted Berlin Tegel Airport in West Berlin, which experienced a severe decline in holiday flights. Pilots at Pan Am, which had a hub at Tegel, reportedly considered operating flights to Greece without pay to allow the airline to compete with Interflug.

Interflug signed an agreement with Turkish Airlines giving the two airlines exclusive rights to offer dedicated flights for Turkish Gastarbeiter to and from West Germany and West Berlin. In the 1980s, Interflug set up a partnership with KLM for a joint operation on the East Berlin-Amsterdam route. Of the six weekly flights, two were operated by KLM's Fokker F28 Fellowships, and four by Interflug's Tu-134s and Il-62s. As neither airline was allowed to cross the intra-German border, the KLM flights were routed via Denmark, and Interflug used a southern routing over Czechoslovakia.

During the annual Leipzig Trade Fair, at that time considered the most important meeting place for businesspeople and politicians from both sides of the Iron Curtain, Lufthansa and Interflug were granted special permits to operate flights between Leipzig and West Germany. In 1986, Lufthansa and Interflug applied for joint traffic rights for year-round scheduled intra-German flights over the Iron Curtain, which were initially rejected by the Western Allies (likely due to concerns that their unique market position for flights to and from Berlin might be weakened), and only granted in August 1989. Interflug was then able to launch flights on the Leipzig-Düsseldorf route, while Lufthansa began serving the Frankfurt-Leipzig leg. In 1990, Interflug added flights from Dresden to Hamburg and Cologne.

Fleet

Over the years, Interflug operated the following aircraft types on its commercial flights:

Accidents and incidents

Fatal
On 26 July 1964, an Interflug Antonov An-2 (registered DM-SKS) crashed near Magdeburg, killing the two occupants.
The Königs Wusterhausen air disaster, the deadliest to date in Germany with 156 fatalities (and second-deadliest in the world at the time, only surpassed by All Nippon Airways Flight 58) occurred on 14 August 1972, when an Interflug Ilyushin Il-62 (registered DM-SEA), then one of the world's largest passenger jets, crashed during an emergency landing attempt near Schönefeld Airport. The aircraft, registered DM-SEA, was the first Il-62 operated by Interflug. Shortly into the Berlin-Burgas flight, the aircrew encountered problems with the elevators caused by a fire in the cargo bay, which destroyed part of the rear fuselage. The aircrew subsequently tried to return to the airport, ultimately sending the airplane into an uncontrolled descent.
On 1 September 1975, an Interflug Tupolev Tu-134 (registered DM-SCD) crashed during its approach into Leipzig/Halle Airport, killing 27 of the 34 people on board (three crew and four passengers survived). The aircraft had been travelling from Stuttgart, West Germany, to Leipzig (such flights were only operated during the Leipzig Trade Fair). It was later determined that the pilots had not properly checked the aircraft's altitude, leading to a descent below the glide slope and a collision with an antenna mast.
On 26 March 1979, a cargo-configured Interflug Ilyushin Il-18 (registered DM-STL) overshot the runway at Luanda Airport in Angola following an engine failure during the take-off run. The aircraft broke up and erupted into flames, killing all ten people on board.
On 17 June 1989, an Ilyushin Il-62 (registered DDR-SEW) operating Interflug Flight 102 to Moscow overshot the runway during a take-off attempt at Schönefeld Airport and caught fire, killing 21 of the 103 passengers on board (all ten crew members survived), and one person on the ground. The accident started when a rudder jammed because of a locking tab that had been left in place during maintenance. When instructed to apply reverse thrust, the flight engineer mistakenly switched the engines off. Because the accident occurred on the anniversary of the 1953 East German uprising, the resulting tense atmosphere in the GDR initially led to suspicions of sabotage, delaying medical assistance to survivors.

Non-fatal
On 22 November 1977, an Interflug Tu-134 (registered DM-SCM) on a flight from Moscow was damaged beyond repair in a landing accident at Schönefeld Airport. The aircraft, with 74 people aboard, crashed into the runway due to an excessive sink rate caused by faulty handling of the autopilot.
On 11 February 1991, Interflug's scheduled Berlin-Moscow flight was involved in a go-around incident at Sheremetyevo Airport. The captain of the Airbus A310 (registered D-AOAC) disagreed with the flight computer settings for the go-around, and the resulting opposite control inputs from the flight computer caused a total of four stalls, including one that pitched the aircraft up to 88 degrees (nearly vertical). The pilots eventually recovered control and landed the aircraft. Taking place after the crash of an Airbus A320 during a 1988 demonstration flight, the incident further demonstrated the danger of aircrews inadvertently or deliberately countermanding automatic safety protocols built into modern jetliners.

Criminal incidents
On 10 March 1970, a hijacking attempt occurred on an Interflug flight from East Berlin to Leipzig. Armed with pistols, a young husband and wife, Eckhard and Christel Wehage, demanded the pilot fly the Antonov An-24 – which had 15 other passengers on board – to Hanover in West Germany to escape the Iron Curtain. The pilot claimed not to have enough fuel, and the Wehages agreed to fly to Tempelhof Airport in West Berlin. The plane returned to Schönefeld Airport instead, leading the Wehages to kill themselves.
A similar hijacking attempt failed during an Interflug flight from Erfurt to East Berlin on 30 January 1980. 
On 20 December 1980, Interflug Flight 302 from East Berlin to Budapest was subjected to a bomb threat. En route, a handwritten note was discovered claiming a bomb was hidden on the Tupolev Tu-134 and would be triggered once the aircraft descended below 600 metres. The crew decided to divert to Poprad, a Czechoslovak airport located at an elevation of 718 metres. There, a backpack was found which did not belong to any of the passengers. No information was released about its contents.

In popular culture
The East German TV series Treffpunkt Flughafen was produced between 1985 and 1986. In eight episodes, it deals with the fictional crew of an Interflug Ilyushin Il-62, and their (often negative) experiences and adventures in foreign countries, which the average East German citizen could either not afford or was not allowed to travel to.
The intentional landing of a former Interflug Ilyushin Il-62 on a 900-metre-long grass runway in Gollenberg on 23 October 1989 received widespread media attention.

Notes

References

External links 

 Ticket of Interflug

 
Defunct airlines of Germany
Airlines of East Germany
Airlines established in 1958
Airlines disestablished in 1991
1958 establishments in East Germany
German companies disestablished in 1991
German companies established in 1958